The 49th Filmfare Awards South ceremony honouring the winners and nominees of the best of South Indian cinema in films released 2001, is an event that held on 20 April 2002 at the Jawaharlal Nehru Stadium, Chennai.

The awards were distributed at Chennai on 20 April 2002.

Multiple nominations and awards

Kannada

Nominations
 5 nominations: Huchcha
 3 nominations: Vaalee
 2 nominations: Kothigalu Saar Kothigalu
 1 nomination: Nanna Preethiya Hudugi, Kotigobba, Kanasugara, Gattimela and Chithra

Awards
 1 award: Huchcha, Kothigalu Saar Kothigalu, Nanna Preethiya Hudugi, Kanasugara and Chithra

Malayalam

Nominations
 4 nominations: Meghamalhar and Uthaman
 2 nominations: Theerthadanam and Kattu Vannu Vilichappol
 1 nomination: Karumadikkuttan, Ravanaparabhu and Ishtam

Awards
 2 awards: Meghamalhar
 1 award: Karumadikkuttan, Theerthadanam, and Ravanaparabhu

Tamil

Nominations
 4 nominations: Aanandham and Kasi
 2 nominations: Nandha and Poovellam Un Vasam
 1 nomination: Friends, Pandavar Bhoomi, Aalavandhan and Minnale

Awards
 3 awards: Minnale (including female debut and female playback singer)
 2 awards: Nandha (including cinematography)
 1 award: Aanandham, Pandavar Bhoomi, Kasi and Paarthale Paravasam (Choreography)

Telugu

Nominations
 5 nominations: Murari
 4 nominations: Nuvvu Nenu and Narasimha Naidu
 3 nominations: Kushi 
 1 nomination: Preminchu

Awards
 4 awards: Nuvvu Nenu
 1 award: Kushi

Main awards
Winners are listed first, highlighted in boldface.

Kannada cinema

Malayalam cinema

Tamil cinema

Telugu cinema

Technical Awards

Special awards

References

General

Specific

External links
 
 

Filmfare Awards South
2002 Indian film awards